Hermon is a small rural village in the parish of Llanfyrnach and the community of Crymych, Pembrokeshire, Wales, about  southeast of Crymych.

History
A pre-1850 parish map shows an inn in the village, The Lamb Inn which, according to CAMRA, is now (2018) closed.

Chapel

There are two chapels in the village. Hermon Baptist Chapel was built in 1808 and subsequently rebuilt the same century. Brynmyrnach Welsh Independent Chapel was built in 1888.

Community Centre
When Hermon School closed in 2006, it was bought by the community, extended and converted into a Community Resource Centre (Canolfan Hermon), which was completed in 2013. The 53 pupils of the school transferred to Ysgol-y-Frenni Community Primary School.

References

External links
 Hermon Community Resource Centre

Villages in Pembrokeshire